Moisture management or moisture-wicking is a functional property in fabrics that enables them to absorb moisture from the skin, spreading it over a large surface area,  helps in drying quickly.

Moisture wicking 
Moisture-wicking clothes absorb the moisture (in the form of sweat), spreads it to the larger surface, and dries more quickly than a regular clothing item. Hence it avoids saturation of the moisture and feeling of dampness.

Moisture comfort 
Moisture comfort in clothing is the preservation from the sensation of dampness. A study about the human body's response and sweating Hollies suggests, '' When more than 50–65% of the body surface is wet, it feels uncomfortable.''

Though cotton is a comfortable and skin-friendly natural fibre, its high absorbency rate makes it very uncomfortable to wear once saturated.

Application 
An article of clothing with moisture-wicking properties helps in enhancing the performance of the wearer. Hence it is helpful in sportswear and athleisure.

Test 
The property is quantifiable through various test procedures. Example tests are ISO 13029:2012, and AATCC TM195.

See also 

 Plated fabric is a suitable fabric construction for moisture-wicking fabrics.

References

Textiles
Properties of textiles